Allonecte is a genus in the Tubeufiaceae family of fungi.

References

External links
Allonecte at Index Fungorum

Tubeufiaceae